Williams is an unincorporated community in Mathews County, in the U. S. state of Virginia.

Poplar Grove Mill and House was listed on the National Register of Historic Places in 1969.

References

Unincorporated communities in Virginia
Unincorporated communities in Mathews County, Virginia